Gun Girls is an American crime film, written, edited and directed by Robert C. Dertano as well as being based on Dertrano's novel Girls on Parole.  The film starred Jeanne Ferguson, Jacqueline Park, Eve Brent and Timothy Farrell and was released in 1957 by Astor Pictures.

Plot

Teenagers Teddy (Ferguson) and Dora (Park) rob a man of his wallet. Dora's boyfriend Jimmy (Booth) tries to talk her out of associating with Teddy but Dora refuses to listen. Using the money they have saved from previous crimes, they buy two guns from Joe (Farrell) and hold up a gas station. Joe then convinces the girls to steal a $6,000 payroll from a chemical company where his girlfriend Joy (Brent) works. After discovering that they only ended up with $14 the two girls ask Joe for money so they can leave the area and avoid arrest. When he refuses, they pull their guns on him and take his money. Joy then comes by Joe's apartment and tells him that she is pregnant resulting in Joe throwing her out of his apartment. Later, when she returns she finds his new girlfriend, Trixie (Cameron), in the apartment. The two girls fight and a beaten Trixie leaves. Joe returns to the apartment and surprises Joy who shoots him. Teddy is killed in a car crash and Dora is mortally injured when they are chased by the police attempting to flee the area. At the hospital, just before she dies, Dora tells Jimmy that she was wrong and should have listened to him.

Cast
 Jeanne Ferguson as Teddy 
 Jacquelyn Park as Dora Jones 
 Eve Brent as Joy Jenkins (as Jean Ann Lewis) 
Timothy Farrell as Joe  
 Calvin Booth as Jimmy
 Eleoise Cameron as Trixie

See also
 Catfight
 List of American films of 1957

References

External links

American crime drama films
1957 films
1957 crime drama films
American black-and-white films
American independent films
1950s exploitation films
1950s independent films
1950s English-language films
1950s American films